Richard "Bill" Armstrong (July 16, 1873 – August 4, 1938) was an American college football player and coach. He served as the head football coach at the College of William & Mary in 1896, the United States Naval Academy from 1897 to 1899 and the Hampton Institute—now known as Hampton University—in 1912, compiling a career college football coaching record of 24–8. At the Naval Academy, Armstrong also coached rowing from 1897 to 1899. 

Armstrong was born on July 16, 1873, at his grandfather's home in Saybrook, Connecticut. His parents, William Nevins Armstrong and Frances Morgan Armstrong, were residents of Hampton, Virginia. His uncle, Samuel C. Armstrong, was an American Civil War general who founded Hampton University. Armstrong attended the Banner School in Hampton and Phillips Academy in Andover, Massachusetts before moving on to Yale University from which he graduated from Sheffield Scientific School in 1895.

Armstrong married Rosa Fairfax Lee in Hampton, on April 21, 1906. He later worked in the oyster growing, farming and real estate professions.

In May 1938, Armstrong was treated for a serious illness at Johns Hopkins Hospital in Baltimore. He returned to his home in Hampton in June, where he died on August 4, 1938 after suffering a paralytic stroke.

Head coaching record

Football

References

External links
 

1873 births
1938 deaths
19th-century players of American football
Hampton Pirates football coaches
Navy Midshipmen football coaches
Navy Midshipmen rowing coaches
William & Mary Tribe football coaches
Yale Bulldogs football players
Yale Bulldogs rowers
Phillips Academy alumni
People from Deep River, Connecticut
People from Hampton, Virginia
Coaches of American football from Virginia
Players of American football from Virginia